The 2008 South Florida Bulls football team represented the University of South Florida (USF) in the 2008 NCAA Division I FBS football season.  Their head coach was Jim Leavitt, and the USF Bulls played all of their home games at Raymond James Stadium in Tampa, FL.  The 2008 college football season was the 12th season overall for the Bulls and their fourth season in the Big East Conference. The 2008 season was the first in which the team was ranked in the preseason rankings.

Schedule

Schedule dates, times, and opponents are subject to change.

Rankings

References

South Florida
South Florida Bulls football seasons
Gasparilla Bowl champion seasons
South Florida Bulls football